Area codes 609 and 640 are telephone area codes in the North American Numbering Plan (NANP) for the central and southern parts of the U.S. state of New Jersey. The numbering plan area includes the cities of Trenton, Princeton, Ewing, Hamilton, and southeastern parts of the state and the Jersey Shore, including Atlantic City and  Long Beach Island. In terms of geographic coverage, it is the largest numbering plan area in New Jersey. Area code 609 was created in a split of area code 201 in c. 1956.  Area code 640 is an additional area code for the modern configuration of 609, creating an overlay numbering plan.

History
In the original configuration of the first nationwide telephone numbering plan of 1947, all of New Jersey was a single numbering plan area, assigned the first of all area codes, 201. By 1956, it was split to create a second numbering plan area, 609.
This division generally followed the dividing line between North Jersey, proximate to New York City, and South Jersey, proximate to Philadelphia and the Jersey Shore.
 Despite the division into two numbering plan areas, all calls within the state of New Jersey were dialed without area codes until July 21, 1963.

Despite the presence of the Philadelphia suburbs, Trenton, Princeton and Atlantic City, South Jersey is not as densely populated as North Jersey. As a result, while North Jersey went from one area code to four during the 1990s, 609 remained the sole area code for the southern half of New Jersey for 41 years. By the late 1990s, however, the proliferation of cell phones and pagers, particularly in the Philadelphia suburbs, Trenton, and Atlantic City, made it clear that South Jersey needed another area code.

In 1999, the southwestern part of the old 609 territory, including most of the New Jersey side of the Philadelphia area, was split off with area code 856. The new area code entered service on June 14; permissive dialing of 609 continued across South Jersey until November 14. Since that time, the 609 territory covers parts of Central Jersey, South Jersey and the Jersey Shore, and many parts of Burlington County. It also includes portions of southern Middlesex County in Plainsboro, Cranbury, parts of South Brunswick (particularly Kingston) and the extreme southern part of Monroe. The boundary was drawn so that several towns were divided between by area codes.

An October 2014 exhaustion forecast expected the 609 number pool to be exhausted by the second quarter of 2017, about 15 months later than projected a year earlier. Permissive dialing began in mid-January 2018, and ended mid-August when 10-digit dialing became mandatory. In mid-September, new assignments of numbers with the 640 area code commenced.

References

External links

609
609
Atlantic County, New Jersey
Burlington County, New Jersey
Cape May County, New Jersey
Hunterdon County, New Jersey
Mercer County, New Jersey
Middlesex County, New Jersey
Monmouth County, New Jersey
Ocean County, New Jersey
1947 establishments in New Jersey